LS2 may refer to:
 The GM LS engine
 The Rolladen-Schneider LS2 glider
 Postcode area for the northern part of Central Leeds
 Life Sciences Switzerland, a federation of scientific societies
 A line-switch pedal made by Boss Corporation
 A chinese brand of motorcycle helmets

External links
LS2 LS2 helmets
LS2 Larson Shannahan Slifka Group